Operation Juniper Shield, formerly known as Operation Enduring Freedom – Trans Sahara (OEF-TS), is the military operation conducted by the United States and partner nations in the  Saharan and Sahel regions of Africa, consisting of counterterrorism efforts and policing of arms and drug trafficking across central Africa. It is part of the Global War on Terrorism (GWOT). The other OEF mission in Africa is Operation Enduring Freedom – Horn of Africa (OEF-HOA).

Congress approved $500 million for the Trans-Saharan Counterterrorism Initiative (TSCTI) over six years to support countries involved in counterterrorism against alleged threats of al-Qaeda operating in African countries, primarily Algeria, Chad, Mali, Mauritania, Niger, Senegal, Nigeria, and Morocco. This program builds upon the former Pan Sahel Initiative (PSI), which concluded in December 2004 and focused on weapon and drug trafficking, as well as counterterrorism. TSCTI has both military and non-military components to it. OEF-TS is the military component of the program. Civil affairs elements include USAID educational efforts, airport security, Department of the Treasury, and State Department efforts.

Canada deployed teams of less than 15 CSOR members to Mali throughout 2011 to help combat militants in the Sahara. Although the special forces will not engage in combat, they will train the Malian military in basic soldiering. Areas include communications, planning, first aid, and providing aid to the general populace.

Mission
Operation Enduring Freedom Trans Sahara is primarily a training mission meant to equip 10 nations to combat insurgents in the region. Africa Command states:

At some point in 2013, OEF-TS was redesignated as Operation Juniper Shield. Operation Juniper Shield encompasses American operations across Algeria, Burkina Faso, Cameroon, Chad, Mali, Mauritania, Morocco,
Niger, Nigeria, Senegal, and Tunisia.

Training programs

Flintlock

Twice a year, the Joint Combined Exchange Training (JCET) program holds a multinational training exercise. Called Flintlocks, these exercises are meant to strengthen special forces from the United States as well as multiple other nations. Participants include troops from the Sahel and those from NATO members. Flintlock started in 1988 and continued through Operation Enduring Freedom, and is now held in Africa. The exercises teach medical operations, infantry and peacekeeping training, airborne operations, humanitarian relief, and leadership skills. The amount each category is stressed depends on the host nation's needs. In addition, participants are put through different scenarios involving skills instructed during the exercise.

Mali was supposed to host the 2012 exercise, but the United States decided to postpone the exercise. Officials say Flintlock was postponed because Mali is facing a renewed Tuareg insurgency.

The Atlas Accord
Although the Flintlock Exercise was postponed, another training program in Mali was not. The Atlas Accord was created in 2012 to train African military personnel in a number of skills while focusing on logistics. The exercise includes classroom instruction and field instruction. Atlas Accord 12 focused solely on logistics and aerial resupply, while the next exercise in 2013 will continue training in aerial logistics but will also include command, control, communications, and computer (C4) techniques.

African Lion exercise
The largest training exercise, African Lion, is an annual security cooperation exercise held by the US and Morocco. Created in 2008, this program is designed to instruct a variety of skills, including aerial logistics, non-lethal weapons training, combined arms and maneuver exercises. More than 900 Moroccans and 1,200 Americans take part in the two-week exercise.

History
On 12 September 2007, a USAF C-130 was damaged from rifle fire by Tuareg forces while the aircraft was engaged in a supply drop to besieged Malian soldiers, no Americans were wounded in the incident. The Joint Special Operations Command (JSOC) established the Joint Special Operations Task Force–Trans Sahara (JSOTF-TS) to help combat terrorism in the region. In 2012, the name of Operation Enduring Freedom - Trans Sahara transitioned to Operation Juniper Shield, although the operation was still referred to in US Government sources as OEF-TS as late as 2014. 

ABC News reported that US forces arrived in Niger in early 2013 to support the French military intervention in Mali; 150 US personnel set up a surveillance drone operation over Mali that was conducted out of Niamey. As of 2017, there were about 800 US troops in Niger, the majority of whom are construction crews working to build up a second drone base in northern Niger. The remainder conduct a surveillance drone mission out of Niamey that helps out the French in Mali and other regional countries in the fight against the terrorists, and less than a hundred US Army Special Forces soldiers are also advising and assisting Niger's military to build up their fighting capability to counter the terrorists. CNN reported that following the Tongo Tongo ambush in October 2017, which left 4 US soldiers killed, the government of Niger granted the US military the authority to arm its drones in Niger; the US military had been seeking the authority to arm its drones in Niger for months prior to the ambush.

ABC News also reported that there are 300 U.S. military personnel in Burkina Faso and Cameroon carrying out the same task as US forces in Niger, The Guardian reported that the US military deployed 300 personnel to Cameroon in early October 2015, with the approval of the Cameroonian government, their primary mission was to provide intelligence support to local forces as well as conducting reconnaissance flights, The personnel are also overseeing a program to transfer American military vehicles to the Cameroonian Army to aid in their fight against Islamist militants, Army Times later reported that US soldiers in Cameroon are also providing IED awareness training to the country's infantry forces. CNN reported that in May 2016 that US personnel conduct the drone operations from Garoua to help provide intelligence in the region to assist local forces.

See also 
 Tuareg Rebellion (2007–2009)
 Insurgency in the Maghreb (2002–present)
 2012 Northern Mali conflict
 List of wars 2003-current

References

Sources

External links
 Official United States Africa Command site
 Maps of Operation Enduring Freedom
 Trans-Sahara Counterterrorism Initiative Details of the operation by Global Security.

War on terror
Counterterrorism in the United States
Juniper Shield
Juniper Shield
Conflicts in 2022